Andrei Tiberiu Maria (born 27 July 1983), better known by his stage name Smiley, is a Romanian singer, songwriter, record producer, and internet vlogger. He was part of the band Simplu and since then he developed a solo career. With more than 1 million singles sold from 2001, certified gold, he is the best-selling male artist and the most successful pop star in Romania. In 2013, he won "Best Romanian Act" during the MTV Europe Music Awards held in Amsterdam.

He had been nominated as a solo act three times for the same award in 2008, 2009 and 2011 and twice in 2006 and 2007 as part of Simplu. He is part of the Romanian Euro-House project Radio Killer where he is known as Killer 1. As of November 2013, he is the new Goodwill Ambassador for UNICEF Romania. He is a television personality, having hosted Românii au talent for eleven consecutive seasons (2011–present) and being a coach in Vocea României also for nine consecutive seasons (2011–2019).

History 
He started in music at a very young age. For three years he was part of the Romanian group Millenium 3 and was noted by Gyuri Pascu as a potential star. He also tried for the band Akcent in a bid to join the band.

Simplu 
After an invitation by CRBL, he joined the singing and dancing band Simplu (stylized as SIMPLU). The members were CRBL, Smiley, OmuNegru, Piticu and Francezu. Because of his reported cheerful attitude, he was nicknamed Smiley by the band, a name he adopted for his career, soon becoming the frontman of the band, at the same time developing a solo career.

Simplu released five studio albums with Smiley: Oare știi (2002), Zece (2004), RMX Simplu (2006), Oficial îmi merge bine (2006) and "Dance or die trying" (2011) in addition to the compilation Simplu Best Of. In 2008, Smiley and Simplu won "Best show" during the dance program Istoria Dansului. In 2007–2008, he was also in the TV series  One Step Ahead as Sebastian 'Seba' Novinski and subject of lead role in the 2008 film Un film simplu directed by Tom Gatsoulis.

Radio Killer 
Smiley has also formed the Romanian Euro-House project Radio Killer launched through an initiative of Smiley and his HaHaHa Production company. Radio Killer is made up of seven members:
Killer 1: Smiley
Killer 2: EleFunk (Serban-Ionut Cazan)
Killer 3: CellBlock
Killer 4: Karie
Killer 5: Boogie Man (Don Baxter)
Killer 6: Crocodealer (Alex Velea)
The Real Killer: Paul Damixie

The group released the single "Be Free" in 2010 on Blanco Y Negro label, the international release "Lonely Heart" on various labels in Romania, France, Spain, Italy, Netherlands and Sweden in 2011 and "Don't Let The Music End" on EMI in 2012. The band also enjoys popularity in Russia. In 2013, Radio Killer released a joint EP Clothes Off with Francesco Diaz & Young Rebels with various mixes of their hit "Clothes Off".

In popular culture 
In 2008, he had the lead role in the comedy Un film simplu by director Tom Gatsoulis. The comedy inspired by the group Simplu and Smiley's career, is about the difficult choices Smiley had to make: his bandmates and friends or international fame as he is confronted by an American talent scout who is offering him a lucrative deal provided he quits his band, Simplu. The band members realize what's going on and they don't like it.

Hosting Românii au talent 
Smiley has been a television personality co-hosting the TV show Românii au talent with Pavel Bartoș for eight consecutive seasons, starting with the inaugural season 1 in 2011.

In Vocea României 
He was also invited as a presiding judge in Vocea României, the Romanian version of the international music competition franchise The Voice. Ştefan Stan from Team Smiley won the first ever title in Romania for season 1 of the show. Ştefan Stan released his debut album Povestea mea with Smiley's production HaHaHa productions; releasing "You Give Me Love" written by his coach Smiley before signing a deal with Universal Music Romania.

Awards and nominations 

2006 and 2007: Nominated as part of Simplu (twice)
2008, 2009 and 2011: Nominated as a solo act (three times)
2013: Won "Best Romanian Act" (once)

Certified albums
Oare știi? (2002; as part of Simplu): Gold in  Romania for 35,000 copies sold
În lipsa mea (2008): Gold in Romania for 10,000 copies sold

Charted songs

Number-ones
"Oare știi? (2002; as part of Simplu):  RO 1
"Oficial îmi merge bine" (2006; as part of Simplu):  RO 1
"Love Is For Free" (2011; featuring Pacha Man):  RO 1
"Dream Girl" (2011):  RO 1
"Dead Man Walking" (2012):  RO 1
"Acasă" (2013):  RO 1
"De unde vii la ora asta?" (2017):  RO 1
"Vals" (2017):  RO 1
"Ne vedem noi" (2020; with Delia):  RO 1
"Rita" (2021; with Connect-R):  RO 1
"Scumpă foc" (2022; with Juno):  RO 1

Top 10s
"Să zburăm spre cer" (2003; as part of Simplu):  RO 6
"O secundă" (2004; as part of Simplu):  RO 9
"Jumătatea ta" (2004; as part of Simplu; with Cream):  RO 3
"Mr. Originality" (2007; as part of Simplu):  RO 5
"În lipsa mea" (2008; featuring Uzzi):  RO 3
"Preocupat de gura ta" (2008):  RO 8
"Am bani de dat" (2008):  RO 9
"Voila" (2009; as part of Radio Killer):  RO 10
"Lonely Heart" (2011; as part of Radio Killer):  RO 7
"Cai verzi pe pereti" (2012):  RO 2
"Dincolo de cuvinte" (2013):  RO 4
"Da-o tare" (2014):  RO 3
"Oarecare" (2015):  RO 2
"Îndrăgostiti desi n-am vrut" (2016):  RO 6
"In statie la Lizeanu" (2017; with Damian Draghici & Brothers):  RO 10
"Ce ma fac cu tine azi" (2017; featuring Guess Who:  RO 2
"Aprinde scanteia" (2018; featuring Dorian Micu):  RO 4
"Jumatate" (2019; with Sore):  RO 9
"Ce mai faci, straine" (2020):  RO 3

Other peaks
"Hai-bye" (2002; as part of Simplu):  RO 47
"Radio înseamnă" (2002; as part of Simplu):  RO 37
"Zece" (2005; as part of Simplu):  RO 82
"Designed to Love You" (2009):  RO 29
"Be Free" (2010; as part of Radio Killer):  RO 17
"Don't Let the Music End" (2011; as part of Radio Killer):  RO 44
"Calling You" (2012; as part of Radio Killer):  RO 17
"Criminal" (2013):  RO 13
"Nemuritor" (2014):  RO 30
"Statul" (2014):  RO 53
"I Wish" (2015):  RO 13
"Song About Nothing" (2019):  RO 35
"Ai grija de femeia ta" (2019):  RO 70
"My Love" (2019):  RO 37
"Cine-i salveaza pe eroi" (2020):  RO 44
"Va fi bine!" (2020):  RO 59
"Sambata seara" (2020):  RO 12
"Lasa inima sa zbiere" (2021):  RO 12
"Noi doi si noaptea" (2021):  RO 14

Filmography 
Acting
2006: Meseriasii as himself (1 episode, TV series)
2007–2008: One Step Ahead as Sebastian 'Seba' Novinski (26 episodes, TV series)
2008: Un film simplu as Smiley
2011: The Godmother as a priest
2014: Selfie as Pepenar 1
2016: Storks- Toady (Romanian version)  
 2018: Smallfoot- Percy (Romanian version) 
 2019: 101 Dalmatian Street- The singer (music video) 

Television personality
Românii au talent (co-hosting the show)
Vocea României (judge for ninth consecutive seasons)

References

External links 
Official website
Smiley Facebook
HaHaHa production website
HaHaHa production YouTube

English-language singers from Romania
Romanian songwriters
Romanian record producers
Video bloggers
Living people
1983 births
People from Pitești
21st-century Romanian male singers
21st-century Romanian singers
Male bloggers